Chanoclavine-I dehydrogenase (easD (gene), fgaDH (gene)) is an enzyme with systematic name chanoclavine-I:NAD+ oxidoreductase. This enzyme catalises the following chemical reaction

 chanoclavine-I + NAD+  chanoclavine-I aldehyde + NADH + H+

This enzyme catalyses a step in the pathway of ergot alkaloid biosynthesis in certain fungi.

References

External links 
 

EC 1.1.1